Adewale Adegbusi (born 3 March 1958) is a Nigerian boxer. He competed in the 1988 Summer Olympics, where he lost in the quarterfinals of the welterweight competition to Jan Dydak.

References

1958 births
Living people
Boxers at the 1988 Summer Olympics
Nigerian male boxers
Olympic boxers of Nigeria
Welterweight boxers